The 2006 Basingstoke and Deane Council election took place on 4 May 2006 to elect members of Basingstoke and Deane Borough Council in Hampshire, England. One third of the council was up for election and the council stayed under no overall control.

After the election, the composition of the council was:
Conservative 30
Liberal Democrats 15
Labour 12
Independent 3

Background
At the previous election in 2004 the Conservatives were the largest party on the council with 28 seats, but the council was run by an alliance between the Liberal Democrat and Labour parties who had led the council for the previous 11 years. Between them the Liberal Democrat and Labour parties had 28 seats, while the balance was held by 4 Independents.

Between 2004 and 2006 one of the independent councillors, Ian Powney, joined the Liberal Democrats. However he resigned from the council before the election, along with his fellow Liberal Democrat Gill Nethercott. This meant 22 seats were contested in the 2006 election, with 2 by-elections in Popley East and Whitchurch.

Campaign
As well as the 2 councillors who had resigned from the council before the election, a further 3 Conservatives councillors stood down at the election, Alan Denness, Andy Hewitt and Michael Ross. Candidates in the election included candidates from the Green Party for the first time in Basingstoke and Deane, as well as the Conservative, Labour and Liberal Democrat parties and 1 Independent.

In the run up to the election the national Conservative leader David Cameron visited Basingstoke to campaign for his party in the local election.

Election result
The results saw the Conservatives gain 2 seats to hold half of the seats on the council. The Conservatives gained Basing from the Liberal Democrats and Winklebury from Labour. Meanwhile, Labour regained Popley East from the Liberal Democrats, after the former councillor Ian Powney stood down at the election. This meant the governing Liberal Democrat and Labour alliance was reduced to 27 seats, with the Liberal Democrats on 15 and Labour on 12, while independents remained on 3 seats.

Following the election the Conservatives took control of the council after winning the vote for council leader by 30 votes to 26. Conservative John Leek became the new leader of the council after 2 of the 3 independents abstained, along with 2 Labour councillors, the new mayor Tony Jones and Sean Keating. One of the independents who abstained, David Leeks, became a member of the new council cabinet, while the third independent had backed the continuation of the previous Liberal Democrat and Labour administration.

Ward results

References

2006
2006 English local elections
2000s in Hampshire